A faussebraye is a defensive wall located outside the main walls of a fortification. It is of a lower height than the main walls, and is preceded by a ditch. In Greek and Byzantine fortifications, the faussebraye was known as a proteichisma.

References

Fortification (architectural elements)